East Dagomba District is a former district council that was located in Northern Region, Ghana. Originally created as an ordinary district assembly in 1975. However on 1988, it was split off into four new district assemblies: Yendi Municipal District (capital: Yendi), Gushegu-Karaga District (capital: Gushegu), Saboba-Chereponi District (capital: Saboba) and Zabzugu-Tatale District (capital: Zabzugu). The district assembly was located in the eastern part of Northern Region and had Yendi as its capital town.

References

1988 disestablishments in Africa

Districts of the Northern Region (Ghana)

Former districts of Ghana

States and territories disestablished in 1988